Subulina is a genus of small tropical air-breathing land snails, terrestrial pulmonate gastropod mollusks in the family Achatinidae. 

Subulina is the type genus of the subfamily Subulininae.

Species 
The genus Subulina includes the following species:
 
 Subulina abessinica (Thiele, 1933)
 Subulina albini Germain, 1923
 Subulina avakubiensis Pilsbry, 1919
 Subulina bequaerti Pilsbry, 1919
 Subulina biafrae Ortiz de Zárate & Ortiz de Zárate, 1959
 Subulina bicolumellaris E. von Martens, 1895
 Subulina bruggenorum Breure & Ablett, 2018
 Subulina canonica (Mousson, 1886)
 Subulina cereola (Morelet, 1860)
 Subulina chiarinii Pollonera, 1887
 Subulina connollyi Bacci, 1951
 Subulina emini (E. A. Smith, 1890)
 Subulina entebbana (Pollonera, 1907)
 Subulina erlangeri O. Boettger, 1907
 Subulina feai Germain, 1912
 Subulina ferriezi (Morelet, 1882)
 Subulina glabella (Morelet, 1883)
 Subulina glyptochephala Pilsbry, 1919
 Subulina gracilenta (Morelet, 1867)
 Subulina gracillima Connolly, 1919
 Subulina gratacapi Pilsbry, 1919
 Subulina intermedia Taylor, 1877
 Subulina jaensis Preston, 1909
 Subulina kassaiana Rochebrune & Germain, 1904
 Subulina krebedjeensis Germain, 1907
 Subulina lacuum O. Boettger, 1907
 Subulina lasti (E. A. Smith, 1890)
 Subulina leia Putzeys, 1899
 Subulina lowei Pilsbry, 1919
 Subulina mabilliana Bourguignat, 1883
 Subulina mamillata (Craven, 1880)
 Subulina manampetsaensis Fischer-Piette & Testud, 1964
 Subulina maringoensis Preston, 1910
 Subulina moreleti Girard, 1893
 Subulina mrimensis Verdcourt, 1979
 Subulina munzingerii (Jickeli, 1873)
 Subulina newtoni Girard, 1893
 Subulina normalis (Morelet, 1885)
 Subulina octogona Bruguière, 1792 
 Subulina octona (Bruguière, 1798) - miniature awlsnail
 Subulina ornata (Morelet, 1888)
 Subulina parana Pilsbry, 1906
 Subulina pengensis Pilsbry, 1919
 Subulina pergracilis E. von Martens, 1897
 Subulina perlucida (Preston, 1910)
 Subulina perstriata E. von Martens, 1895
 Subulina petrensis (Morelet, 1866)
 Subulina pileata (E. von Martens, 1876)
 Subulina pyramidalis (Morelet, 1883)
 Subulina roccatii Pollonera, 1906
 Subulina simplex (Morelet, 1882)
 Subulina sinistrorsa'' Dupuis, 1922
 Subulina suaveolata (Jickeli, 1873)
 Subulina subangulata Putzeys, 1899
 Subulina subcrenata E. von Martens, 1895
 Subulina taruensis Connolly, 1923
 Subulina terebella (Morelet, 1886)
 Subulina thysvillensis Pilsbry, 1919
 Subulina totistriata Pilsbry, 1906
 Subulina tribulationis Preston, 1911
 Subulina turtoni Connolly, 1923
 Subulina usambarica K. Pfeiffer
 Subulina viridula Connolly, 1923
 Subulina vitrea (Mousson, 1888)
 Subulina yatesi (L. Pfeiffer, 1855)

Synonyms
 Subulina abdita Poey, 1858: synonym of Leptinaria striosa (C. B. Adams, 1849) (junior synonym)
 Subulina angustata (Jickeli, 1873): synonym of Homorus angustatus (Jickeli, 1873)
 Subulina angustior (Dohrn, 1866): synonym of Striosubulina striatella (Rang, 1831)
 Subulina antinorii (Morelet, 1872): synonym of Homorus antorinii (Morelet, 1872)
 Subulina arabica Connolly, 1941: synonym of Homorus arabicus (Connolly, 1941) (original combination)
 Subulina castanea E. von Martens, 1895: synonym of Oreohomorus castaneus (E. von Martens, 1895)
 Subulina chiradzuluensis E. A. Smith, 1899: synonym of Subuliniscus chiradzuluensis (E. A. Smith, 1899) (original combination)
 Subulina crystallina Melvill & Ponsonby, 1896: synonym of Opeas crystallinum (Melvill & Ponsonby, 1896) (original combination)
 Subulina cyanostoma Beck, 1837: synonym of Achatina cyanostoma L. Pfeiffer, 1842: synonym of Homorus cyanostomus'' (L. Pfeiffer, 1842) (nomen nudum)
 Subulina cylindracea Bourguignat, 1890: synonym of Subulona cylindracea (Bourguignat, 1890) (original combination)
 Subulina dohertyi E. A. Smith, 1903: synonym of Nothapalus dohertyi (E. A. Smith, 1903) (original combination)
 Subulina elegans E. von Martens, 1895: synonym of Ischnoglessula elegans (E. von Martens, 1895) (original combination)
 Subulina eulimoides Preston, 1909: synonym of Opeas eulimoides (Preston, 1909) (original combination)
 Subulina glaucocyanea Melvill & Ponsonby, 1896: synonym of Euonyma acus (Morelet, 1889) 
 Subulina grandis Madge, 1938: synonym of Subulina striatella (Rang, 1831): synonym of Striosubulina striatella (Rang, 1831) (junior synonym)
 Subulina isseli Jickeli, 1874: synonym of Pseudopeas isseli (Jickeli, 1874) (original combination)
 Subulina jickelii Bourguignat, 1879: synonym of Homorus variabilis var. jickelii (Bourguignat, 1879): synonym of Homorus variabilis (Jickeli, 1873) (original combination)
 Subulina jouberti Bourguignat, 1890: synonym of Subulona jouberti (Bourguignat, 1890) (original combination)
 Subulina kempi Preston, 1912: synonym of Nothapalinus kempi (Preston, 1912) (original combination)
 Subulina laeocochlis Melvill & Ponsonby, 1896: synonym of Euonyma laeocochlis (Melvill & Ponsonby, 1896) (original combination)
 Subulina lagariensis E. A. Smith, 1904: synonym of Subulona lagariensis (E. A. Smith, 1904) (original combination)
 Subulina lenta E. A. Smith, 1880: synonym of Subulona lenta (E. A. Smith, 1880) (original combination)
 Subulina lhotellerii Bourguignat, 1879: synonym of Homorus variabilis var. lhotellerii (Bourguignat, 1879): synonym of Homorus variabilis (Jickeli, 1873) (original combination)
 Subulina maurtiana (L. Pfeiffer, 1853): synonym of Allopeas mauritianum (L. Pfeiffer, 1853): synonym of Allopeas clavulinum (Potiez & Michaud, 1838) (superseded combination)
 † Subulina nitidula Klika, 1891: synonym of † Pseudoleacina nitidula (Klika, 1891) (new combination)
 Subulina octana [sic]: synonym of Subulina octona (Bruguière, 1789) (unaccepted > misspelling)
 Subulina paucispira E. von Martens, 1892: synonym of Nothapalus paucispira (E. von Martens, 1892) (original combination)
 Subulina perrieriana Bourguignat, 1883: synonym of Homorus perrierianus (Bourguignat, 1883) (original combination)
 Subulina pietersburgensis Preston, 1909: synonym of Opeas lineare (F. Krauss, 1848)
 Subulina pinguis E. von Martens, 1895: synonym of Subulona pinguis (E. von Martens, 1895)
 Subulina plebeia (Morelet, 1885): synonym of Pseudopeas plebeium (Morelet, 1885) (superseded combination)
 Subulina porrecta E. von Martens, 1898: synonym of Mayaxis porrecta (E. von Martens, 1898) (original combination)
 Subulina purcelli Melvill & Ponsonby, 1901: synonym of Euonyma purcelli (Melvill & Ponsonby, 1901) (original combination)
 Subulina ruwenzoriensis Pollonera, 1907: synonym of Subuliniscus ruwenzoriensis (Pollonera, 1907) (original combination)
 Subulina sargi Crosse & P. Fischer, 1877: synonym of Pseudosubulina sargi (Crosse & P. Fischer, 1877) (original combination)
 Subulina servaini Mabille, 1887: synonym of Tortaxis servaini (Mabille, 1887) (original combination)
 Subulina solidiuscula E. A. Smith, 1880: synonym of Subulona solidiuscula (E. A. Smith, 1880) (original combination)
 Subulina splendens Thiele, 1910: synonym of Homorus splendens (Thiele, 1910) (original combination)
 Subulina striatella (Rang, 1831): synonym of Striosubulina striatella (Rang, 1831) (superseded combination)
 Subulina strigilis Melvill & Ponsonby, 1901: synonym of Opeas strigile (Melvill & Ponsonby, 1901) (original combination)
 Subulina suaveolans Jickeli, 1874: synonym of Homorus suaveolatus (Jickeli, 1873) (unjustified subsequent emendation)
 Subulina subulata (Jickeli, 1873): synonym of Homorus subulatus (Jickeli, 1873)
 Subulina trochlea (L. Pfeiffer, 1842): synonym of Subulina octona (Bruguière, 1789) (junior synonym)
 Subulina tugelensiis Melvill & Ponsonby, 1897: synonym of Euonyma tugelensis (Melvill & Ponsonby, 1897) (original combination)
 Subulina uncta E. A. Smith, 1903: synonym of Nothapalus unctus (E. A. Smith, 1903) (original combination)
 Subulina variabilis (Jickeli, 1873): synonym of Homorus variabilis (Jickeli, 1873)
 Subulina victoriae (Kobelt, 1913): synonym of Subulina entebbana (Pollonera, 1907) (junior synonym)
 Subulina virgo Preston, 1911: synonym of Cecilioides virgo (Preston, 1911) (original combination)

References

External links 
 ITIS info
 Beck, H. (1837). Index molluscorum praesentis aevi musei principis augustissimi Christiani Frederici. 1-99. Hafniae
 Nevill, G. (1869). Additional notes on the land-shells of the Seychelles Islands. Proceedings of the Zoological Society of London. 1869: 61-66
  Poinar, G. O., Jr. & Roth, B. (1991). Terrestrial snails (Gastropoda) in Dominican amber. The Veliger. 34(3): 253-258
 Breure, A. S. H. & Araujo, R. (2017). The Neotropical land snails (Mollusca, Gastropoda) collected by the “Comisión Científica del Pacífico.”. PeerJ. 5, e3065.

Subulininae
Taxonomy articles created by Polbot